Chalcosyrphus is a genus of hoverflies in the subfamily Eristalinae. Many species exhibit some degree of mimicry of various sawflies and other hymenopterans and are often brightly coloured or metallic in hue. The adults are similar in structure and behavior to the related genus Xylota but differ in larval morphology.
They can be found throughout Europe, Asia, and North America and seem to prefer damper, boggy habitats. The larvae are saproxylic feeders in rotten wood in these habitats.

Species

References

Bibliography

External links
Photographic examples and genus info: http://bugguide.net/node/view/7936/bgimage
Lifedesks page for "Chalcosyrphus" taxonomy and references: https://web.archive.org/web/20120502110623/http://syrphidae.lifedesks.org/pages/25038

Hoverfly genera
Eristalinae
Taxa named by Charles Howard Curran